Auerswald is a German surname. Notable people with the surname include:

 Hans Adolf Erdmann von Auerswald (1792–1848), Prussian general and politician
 Rudolf von Auerswald (1795–1866), German (Prussian) official
 Heinz Auerswald (1908–1970), German lawyer and member of the SS in Nazi Germany
 Ingrid Auerswald (born 1957), German athlete

German-language surnames

de:Auerswald